Sphaerodactylus altavelensis,  also known as the Alto Velo least gecko or Alto Velo sphaero, is a species of lizard in the family Sphaerodactylidae. It is endemic to Hispaniola.

References

Sphaerodactylus
Endemic fauna of Hispaniola
Reptiles of the Dominican Republic
Reptiles of Haiti
Reptiles described in 1933
Taxa named by Gladwyn Kingsley Noble